Farida Fassi FAAS is a Moroccan professor of physics at Mohammed V University in Rabat She is the co-founder of the African Strategy for Fundamental Applied Physics and a member of African Academy of Sciences

Life and education 
Fassi was born in Larache where she attended middle and high school before moving to Tetouan to complete her university studies. She obtained her Bachelor of Science in physics from Abdelmalek Essaâd University in 1996. After that, she moved to Spain, the University of Valencia, where she obtain her Master of Science in 1999. In 2003, she was awarded a Doctor of Philosophy in particle physics due to her work on the ATLAS experiment at CERN.

Career and research 
Until 2003, Fassi was part of the ATLAS and Compact Muon Solenoid (CMS) combined experiment team which later discovered the Higgs boson in 2012. After that, she worked in Grid Computing and Distributed Data Analysis. In 2007, Fassi was elected for a fellowship at CERN. Also, for thirteen years, she has been working in different post-doctoral and Research positions such as the Spanish National Research Council, the French National Centre for Scientific Research, and the Spanish Center for Particle, Astroparticle, and Nuclear Physics. She is a professor of physics at Mohammed V University in Rabat.

Fassi was also featured  in the list of top 50 scientists worldwide according to the international 2021 AD Scientific Index. She has been cited more than 250,000 times and has a h-index of 219. She was ranked thirty eight in the world and second in the African content and Middle east.  Fassi is the founding secretary general of Arab physical Society, and the co-founder of the African Strategy for Fundamental and Applied Physics.

Awards and honours 
Fassi was elected a Fellows of the African Academy of Sciences in 2020.

Selected publications 
CERN ATLAS (2012-9-17). Observation of a new particle in the search for the Standard Model Higgs boson with the ATLAS detector at the LHC, Physics Letters B, 716:1, 1-29
Farida Fassi, " African Strategy for Fundamental and Applied Physics (ASFAP)", The African Physics Newsletter - 8 April 2021.

Miquel Senar, P. Lason, Farida Fassi: Organization of the International Testbed of the CrossGrid Project.

Notes

See also 

 ATLAS experiment 
 Abdellatif Berbich

References 

Moroccan physicists
Moroccan women scientists
Abdelmalek Essaâdi University alumni
University of Valencia alumni
Fellows of the African Academy of Sciences
Year of birth missing (living people)
Living people